102 Herculis is a single star in the northern constellation of Hercules. It is visible to the naked eye as a faint, blue-white hued star with an apparent visual magnitude of 4.37. Based upon parallax measurements, it is located around 920 light years away from the Sun. The star is moving closer to the Earth with a heliocentric radial velocity of −15 km/s.

The stellar classification of this object matches a massive, early B-type star with a luminosity class of IV or V, corresponding to a subgiant or main sequence star, respectively. It is 20 million years old with nearly ten times the mass of the Sun and is spinning with a projected rotational velocity of 41 km/s. The star is radiating 3,632 times the Sun's luminosity from its photosphere at an effective temperature of 22,420 K.

Etymology

This star, together with 93 Her, 95 Her, and 109 Her, formed the now obsolete constellation of Cerberus.

References

B-type subgiants
B-type main-sequence stars
Hercules (constellation)
Durchmusterung objects
Herculis, 102
166182
088886
6787